Nice Day with Buddy Collette is the second album by multi-instrumentalist and composer Buddy Collette, recorded at sessions in late 1956 and early 1957 and released on the Contemporary label.

Reception

The Allmusic review by Scott Yanow states: "Overall this set serves as a good all-around showcase for Buddy Collette's playing and writing talents".

Track listing
All compositions by Buddy Collette except as indicated
 "Nice Day" - 4:19
 "There Will Never Be Another You" (Harry Warren, Mack Gordon) - 4:26
 "Minor Deviation" (Dick Shreve) - 4:42
 "Over the Rainbow" (Harold Arlen, Yip Harburg) - 5:15
 "Change It" - 3:19
 "Moten Swing" (Bennie Moten, Buster Moten) - 3:26
 "I'll Remember April" (Gene de Paul, Patricia Johnston, Don Raye) - 3:09
 "Blues for Howard" - 4:03
 "Fall Winds" - 6:28
 "Buddy Boo" - 4:31 
Recorded at Contemporary's studio in Los Angeles on November 6, 1956 (tracks 1 & 4), November 29, 1956 (tracks 3, 5 & 7-9) and February 18, 1957 (tracks 2, 6 & 10).

Personnel
Buddy Collette - tenor saxophone, alto saxophone, flute, clarinet
Don Friedman (tracks 1 & 4), Calvin Jackson (tracks 2, 6 & 10), Dick Shreve (tracks 3, 5 & 7-9) - piano
John Goodman (tracks 1, 3-5 & 7-9), Leroy Vinnegar (tracks 2, 6 & 10) - bass
Bill Dolney (tracks 3, 5 & 7-9), Shelly Manne (tracks 2, 6 & 10), Joe Peters (tracks 1 & 4) - drums

References

Contemporary Records albums
Buddy Collette albums
1957 albums